Bligny is the name or part of the name of the following communes in France:

 Bligny, Aube, in the Aube department
 Bligny, Marne, in the Marne department
 Bligny-le-Sec, in the Côte-d'Or department
 Bligny-lès-Beaune, in the Côte-d'Or department
 Bligny-sur-Ouche, in the Côte-d'Or department